Gholamreza Ansari (born October 24, 1956) an Iranian politician.  He was elected as a member of Tehran City Council in 2013 local elections. Ansari is a former ambassador of the Islamic Republic of Iran to the Turkmenistan, a position he held from June 2005 to September 2008.

References 

1956 births
Living people
Islamic Iran Solidarity Party politicians
Union of Islamic Iran People Party politicians
Islamic Association of Iranian Medical Society politicians
Tehran Councillors 2013–2017
People from Kashmar